Douglas Leavon Anderson (February 18, 1939 – April 13, 2013) was an American educator and politician from Mississippi. Anderson, a Democrat, was first elected to the Mississippi House of Representatives in 1976. He served in that office until 1980, when he won election to the Mississippi State Senate. He served in the State Senate until 1992.

Elected in 1976, Anderson, Horace Buckley and Fred Banks were among the first four African-Americans elected to the Mississippi Legislature in the twentieth century after Robert G. Clark, Jr., who was elected in 1967. He served from 1994 until his death in 2013 on the Hinds County Board of Supervisors.

Anderson taught in public schools in Meridian, Mississippi and his native Jackson, Mississippi and as an associate professor of mathematics at Jackson State University from 1965 to 1987.

References

1939 births
2013 deaths
Politicians from Jackson, Mississippi
Democratic Party members of the Mississippi House of Representatives
Democratic Party Mississippi state senators
African-American state legislators in Mississippi
County supervisors in Mississippi
Schoolteachers from Mississippi
African-American schoolteachers
Dillard University alumni
University of Oklahoma alumni
Jackson State University faculty
20th-century African-American people
21st-century African-American people